Hawkinge is a town and civil parish in the Folkestone and Hythe district of Kent, England. The original village of Hawkinge is actually just less than a mile (c. 1.3 km) due east of the present village centre; the village of Hawkinge was formed by the merging of Hawkinge and Uphill.

World War II
During World War II, RAF Hawkinge was the closest operational airfield to France and was used during the Battle of Britain. The construction of the houses was hampered by the discovery of several pipe bombs, put there in the event of a German invasion to render the airfield useless to enemy airplanes. There are several reminders of the war in and near the site of the original village; the Kent Battle of Britain Museum and various pillboxes are scattered amongst the farms.

Hawkinge Cemetery is near the site of the aerodrome and most of the 95 Second World War casualties buried there were airmen. About a quarter were killed during the Battle of Britain. Most of the war graves are in a special plot east of the chapel, including 59 German graves, which are together in a group at the south-eastern corner.

Governance
Hawkinge is in the Folkestone and Hythe Westminster constituency.

On Kent County Council, Hawkinge forms part of the Elham Valley Division, represented by Cllr Susan Carey (Conservative). On the Folkestone and Hythe District Council, Hawkinge is covered by the North Downs East ward, represented by Cllrs David Godfrey, Philip Martin, and Stuart Peall (all Conservative). Hawkinge Town Council consists of thirteen elected members; Eleven Conservatives, one UKIP and one Independents.

Transport
The A260 which runs from Folkestone to Barham, where it meets with the A2 to Canterbury originally ran through the centre of the town, before it was replaced with a new bypass opened by Michael Howard on Monday 9 July 2007. The southern section, built in the early 2000s, leads from the A20 to a roundabout where it meets with the northern section. This new section carries traffic around the town centre onto the existing road.

There is a bus service that connects the town to Folkestone and Canterbury. These are normally run by Stagecoach and have route numbers 19, 16 & 73 (Easy Access Bus).

Shops and services
There are two local churches. The Anglican parish church is St Luke's, the ancient parish church of St Michael's having been declared redundant in 1980; and the Baptist Church, having sold its small building, meets in a modern chapel on the first floor of Hawkinge Community Centre.

There are two primary schools: Hawkinge Primary School in the old village, and The Churchill Primary School.

The town publishes its own online newspaper, the Hawkinge Gazette.

The town also has its own local Scout group, 3rd Hawkinge.

Notable residents

Music connections
 DJ and London-based radio personality Owen Thomas James (formerly Owdaug) grew up at his family home in Hawkinge and attended the Harvey Grammar School in Folkestone.

References

External links

 Towns in Kent
Civil parishes in Kent
Folkestone and Hythe District